Liveland Raspberry or Lowland Raspberry is an old cultivar of domesticated apple, first recorded before 1870, that originated from the Livland Governorate of eastern Europe and was introduced into the United States of America in 1883. It is a very early ripening apple.

Descendants
Melba (apple)

References

External links
NAFEX Liveland Raspberry Apple
You Tube
Blog
 National Fruit Collection page

Apple cultivars